Oskar Sandberg is a key contributor to the Freenet Project, and a PhD graduate of the Chalmers Technical University in Gothenburg, Sweden.  Oskar collaborated with Ian Clarke to design the new "darknet" model employed in Freenet 0.7, work which was presented at the DEF CON security conference in July 2005. Oskar recently completed a Ph.D. about the mathematics of complex networks, especially with regard to the small world phenomenon. Besides this he has an active interest in distributed computer networks and network security, and has been an active contributor to the Freenet Project since 1999.  Oskar now works at Google.

Papers
Ian Clarke, Oskar Sandberg, Brandon Wiley, Theodore W. Hong: 
Freenet: A Distributed Anonymous Information Storage and Retrieval System
link

Oskar Sandberg: Searching in a small world (licentiate thesis) link

External links
 Oskar Sandberg - Paper(PDF file): Searching in a Small World.

Living people
Swedish mathematicians
Google employees
Year of birth missing (living people)